"Hit Me with That" is the second single from the self-titled full-length debut album by East Coast hip hop group The Beatnuts. It was released by Relativity Records as a single with "Get Funky" as its b-side in 1994. The song is produced by The Beatnuts and features raps by JuJu, Fashion and Psycho Les. Its lyrics are about how "hardcore" The Beatnuts and their music are. It contains a slow, downtrodden and drum-heavy instrumental that samples "Love & Happiness" by Monty Alexander and "Holy Thursday" by David Axelrod. The song's refrain also contains a scratched sample of Method Man's vocals from "7th Chamber" by Wu-Tang Clan.

Despite the release of a music video directed by David Perez Shadi, "Hit Me with That" failed to chart. The song is nonetheless featured on The Beatnuts' 2001 hits compilation Beatnuts Forever.

Single track list

12" b/w "Get Funky"

A-Side
 "Hit Me with That"
 "Hit Me with That (Instrumental)"
 "Get Funky (Remix Instrumental)"

B-Side
 "Get Funky"
 "Get Funky (Remix)"
 "Get Funky (Instrumental)"

Promo

A-Side
 "Hit Me with That (LP Version)" (3:50)
 "Hit Me with That (Radio Version)" (3:50)

B-Side
 "Hit Me with That (Instrumental)" (3:50)
 "Hit Me with That (Acapella)" (3:50)

References

Hit Me with That
Hit Me with That
1994 songs
Relativity Records singles